Aplared is a locality situated in Borås Municipality, Västra Götaland County, Sweden. It had 465 inhabitants in 2010.

References 

Populated places in Västra Götaland County
Populated places in Borås Municipality